Home to Danger is a 1951 British film noir crime film directed by Terence Fisher starring Guy Rolfe, Rona Anderson and Stanley Baker. It was made at the Riverside Studios in Hammersmith as a supporting feature. The film's sets were designed by the art director Cedric Dawe.

Plot
A young woman returns to Britain following the death of her estranged, wealthy father who is believed to have  committed suicide. It is expected that the bulk of the estate will pass to his business partner. However, when the will is read out she is given most of the money as a gesture of reconciliation by her father. She clings to her belief that he did not kill himself and investigates the circumstances of his death. Before long, plots are being hatched to kill her.

Cast
Guy Rolfe as Robert Irving
Rona Anderson as Barbara Cummings
Francis Lister as Howard Wainright
Alan Wheatley as Hughes
Bruce Belfrage as Solicitor Brooks
Peter Jones as Lips Leonard
Stanley Baker as Willie Dougan
Dennis Harkin as Jimmy-The-One
Philo Hauser as Mick O'Ryan
Cyril Conway as Police Inspector Bayne

Production
In the opening sequence of the film Rona Anderson is shown exiting the rear door of a Boeing 377 Stratocruiser belonging to the British Overseas Airways Corporation, it carries the registration G-ALSA. This aircraft was destroyed in the 1954 Prestwick air disaster.

Critical reception
Radio Times called the film a "standard whodunnit" ; while Britmovie thought it a "tense murder-mystery b-movie."

References

Bibliography
 Chibnall, Steve & McFarlane, Brian. The British 'B' Film. Palgrave MacMillan, 2011.

External links

1951 films
British crime films
1951 crime films
Films directed by Terence Fisher
Films set in England
Films set in London
Films shot at Riverside Studios
British black-and-white films
1950s English-language films
1950s British films